The girls' halfpipe event in freestyle skiing at the 2020 Winter Youth  Olympics took place on 20 January at the Leysin Park & Pipe.

Qualification
The qualification was started at 09:30.

Final
The final was started at 11:10.

References

 

Girls' halfpipe